Charles "Big Chuck" Schodowski (born June 28, 1934) and "Lil' John" Rinaldi (born January 19, 1946) – together commonly known as Big Chuck and Lil' John – are a duo of entertainers who served as late-night horror hosts of The Big Chuck and Lil' John Show on television station WJW in Cleveland, Ohio from 1963 to 2008.  In addition to hosting a movie with a live audience, they also performed original sketch comedy routines.  At the end of each sketch was a very distinctive laugh (see external links section below) voiced by comedian/actor Jay Lawrence, who was a disc jockey for KYW radio in Cleveland during the early 1960s.

On September 10, 2011, WJW began airing a weekly half-hour program – simply titled Big Chuck and Lil' John – featuring classic show skits along with limited new production.

History 
Chuck Schodowski (b. June 28, 1934) started as a producer/engineer at WJW-TV (and before that at KYW-TV), and became a close friend of Ernie Anderson. When Anderson's previous sidekick, eventual Hollywood actor Tim Conway, was fired for a fabrication on his résumé, Schodowski was hired as Conway's replacement. Schodowski worked closely with Anderson (as Ghoulardi) on Shock Theater, and was instrumental in bringing in the blend of blues and polka music that helped define the show, adding comic audio drop-ins to enliven the often awful movies, and immortalized The Rivingtons' tune "Papa Oom Mow Mow" by marrying it to the image of an old man gurning.

When Anderson left Cleveland for California in 1966, his popular Ghoulardi character was retired, and a talent search ensued to find a replacement. Schodowski agreed to help Bob Wells (WJW's "Hoolihan the Weatherman") with his audition, and the management decided they liked the way the two performed together. They became co-hosts of The Hoolihan and Big Chuck Show, which launched on December 23, 1966. In addition to screening horror films, the duo soon started filming comedy skits interspersed within the host segments.

After Wells left the show in 1979, John Rinaldi, a jeweler by trade who had already been featured on many of the program's skits, took over as co-host. The show itself was relaunched as The Big Chuck and Lil' John Show, and while effectively a separate and distinct show, the familiar Catch As Catch Can theme was retained, among other show elements. Moreover, taped skits from the preceding show often would be rerun on The Big Chuck and Lil' John Show through various "oldies nights".

For many years, the show aired at 11:30 p.m. on Friday nights before moving to 11:30 p.m. on Saturday nights starting on October 1, 1988 (to accommodate The Arsenio Hall Show, which WJW was airing following their weeknight 11 p.m. newscasts), then back to Fridays following WJW's affiliation switch to Fox in 1994.

After Fox acquired WJW in 1996, the movies selected for The Big Chuck and Lil' John Show were no longer done by either host, and began to deviate from the original horror/science fiction genre into more conventional movie fare. In addition, the start time was again moved in 1996 to Saturdays at midnight following Mad TV, then after Fox debuted Talkshow with Spike Feresten in 2006, the show settled in its final start time of 12:30 a.m. Saturday nights/Sunday mornings.

Along with the Saturday night shows, Schodowski and Rinaldi hosted a companion Couch Potato Theater program airing from 10 a.m. - noon on Saturday mornings, which featured at various times Three Stooges shorts, episodes of The Abbott and Costello Show, movies, cartoons, or (due to schedule conflicts) an hour long skits only show.

In December 2006, Schodowski announced he would retire in June 2007.  As part of his farewell, WJW broadcast the hour-long retrospective Big Chuck and Lil' John: The End of an Era.
This also marked the end of The Big Chuck and Lil' John Show, with the last regular episode airing the afternoon of June 16, 2007 and again in the early morning of June 17.

In October 2008, Schodowski released his autobiography, Big Chuck!: My Favorite Stories from 47 Years on Cleveland TV, co-written by The Plain Dealer media writer Tom Feran. The book debuted at the 2008 Ghoulardifest convention.

During the summer of 2011, it was announced that Big Chuck and Lil' John would return to TV on WJW every Saturday morning at 11 a.m. (this time, in a 30-minute all skits show similar to the Couch Potato Theater format).  This version of the show began on September 10, 2011. In 2015, the show was moved to Sunday nights at 11:30 p.m. The show moved to Monday mornings at 12:30 a.m. in 2021, and  the show has been retitled The Best of Big Chuck and Lil' John and introductions to the skits have been dropped.

Rinaldi made news in December 2014, when after Cincinnati Bengals head coach Marvin Lewis referred to Cleveland Browns quarterback Johnny Manziel as a "midget", WJW sent him to Cincinnati to cover Lewis' weekly press conference, and asked the coach some questions.

In 2019 the duo reunited with Wells to film the five-episode web series Space Ship One.

Notable sketches and parodies 
 Ben Crazy - a parody of a popular 60's TV medical drama, Ben Casey with Big Chuck as the title character. Originated on Hoolihan & Big Chuck, but had additional sketches filmed throughout the entire run of Big Chuck & Lil' John.
 The Certain Ethnic _ - a play on Big Chuck's Polish heritage featuring Chuck as "Stash Kowalski" – a stereotypical Polish Clevelander (e.g., The Certain Ethnic Motorist, who drives through red traffic lights and stops at green lights). Big Chuck specifically created the term "certain ethnic" as a euphemism for "Polish".
 The Kielbasa Kid - a parody of TV westerns, with Big Chuck as the bumbling hero. Originated on Hoolihan & Big Chuck.
 Readings By Robert - originated on Hoolihan & Big Chuck as a carbon copy of an Ernie Kovacs routine, with Bob Wells in the title role (patterned after Kovacs' "Percy Dovetonsils" character), and Big Chuck as his jazz-ukulele-playing assistant, Carlos. Occasionally rerun throughout the entire run of Big Chuck & Lil' John.
 Parma Place - a parody of the 60's soap-opera Peyton Place. Originated on Ghoulardi but was continuously rerun throughout the entire course of Hoolihan & Big Chuck and Big Chuck & Lil' John
 Soul Man - a parody of Superman where Big Chuck (as "Ed Tarboosh"  –  mild mannered TV producer) would – with the help of his "soul pills" – become Soul Man, who was a big, black, and bumbling superhero (played by longtime station cameraman Herb Thomas).  Originated on Hoolihan & Big Chuck.
 Mary Hartski, Mary Hartski - a parody of the 70's TV show Mary Hartman, Mary Hartman.
 Mariano "Mushmouth" Pacetti - king of the weekly "Pizza Fight" during a six-year period on Hoolihan & Big Chuck.
 Cuyahoga Jones and the Castle of Doom - a parody of the Indiana Jones series, with Big Chuck as the title character – and Lil' John as his sidekick "Short Stuff" – chronicling their attempts to capture the "Kapusta Diamond". These skits were filmed at Squire's Castle in suburban Willoughby Hills, Ohio.

Other cast members 

Big Chuck and Lil' John would use some of WJW's personalities, like station meteorologist Dick Goddard, in their skits.  A popular Goddard sketch revolved around Goddard's claims that WJW had the best doppler radar in Cleveland.  He bragged that WJW's "Super Doppler Google-Plex" was powerful enough to see clearly to a neighborhood, close enough to reveal a woman taking a bath (strategically covered with bubbles) through her bathroom sunroof, as Goddard sheepishly tried to hide the image with his suit jacket.  Goddard would appear in numerous skits through the years, sometimes even playing different characters.

Other longtime supporting players were veteran cameraman/technician Art Lofredo, who appeared in many skits through the years (most frequently as "The Old Man") and had several "Art Lofredo Nights" dedicated to him;  Herb Thomas, a longtime station cameraman who portrayed "Soul Man", and Mary Allen ("the pride of Maple Heights"), who was an older lady and was a viewer who had won an auction in the late 70s to appear on a skit.  She impressed Big Chuck with her performance so much, she became a regular player on the show until the late 90s, appearing most frequently as Stash Kowalski's wife Stella in "The Certain Ethnic __" skits.

News anchor Robin Swoboda was famously featured as the main villain (a Catwoman takeoff) with several Cleveland Browns players portraying her henchmen in "Batguy & Rinaldi" (a parody of Batman & Robin), and sportscasters Casey Coleman, John Telich and Dan Coughlin were used in sports themed skits. Other later skits featured WJW station announcer Bill Ward announcing introductions to skits or for faux testimonial advertisements in the style of Hoolihan.

Owing to the station's long affiliation with the CBS television network, CBS stars like Buddy Ebsen and Andy Griffith made cameos in several skits, as well as Tim Conway (who like Big Chuck began his career on WJW as a sidekick of Ernie Anderson – though on a separate program) who by then was a star on CBS' The Carol Burnett Show. Athletes like Muhammad Ali, Earnie Shavers and Jack Lambert also made guest appearances in skits.

Other show features 
Both The Hoolihan and Big Chuck Show and The Big Chuck and Lil' John Show also made music video parodies as well, including Ray Stevens songs like "Gitarzan", "Indian Love Call" (the skit was titled "The Audio Engineer" and made extensive use of chromakey), "Along Came Jones", "The Streak" and "Bridget the Midget" (which was Lil' John's on-air debut on the show back in 1970), plus other songs like Scott McKenzie's "San Francisco", Jimmy Castor Bunch's "Troglodyte", and Larry Groce's "Junk Food Junkie."

Both shows occasionally would feature a "New Talent Time" sketch where Cleveland area performers, usually performing some sort of offbeat stunt, would be featured. One week featured songwriter Robert McGuire performing his original song "Moon Over Parma", a song that mentioned a journey through the suburbs of Cleveland; the song would later become the theme song for the first season of The Drew Carey Show.

Awards and honors

Big Chuck
29-time Lower Great Lakes Emmy Awards recipient
1994 Silver Circle Award, presented by Local Great Lakes Emmy Awards chapter
Ohio Broadcasters Hall of Fame Inductee (class of 1991)
Cleveland Association of Broadcasters Hall of Fame (class of 1999)

Lil' John
1995 Silver Circle Award, presented by Local Great Lakes Emmy Awards chapter
2001 Lower Great Lakes Emmy Award recipient (as co-host of The Big Chuck and Lil' John Show) - Regularly Scheduled Entertainment Program
Ohio Broadcasters Hall of Fame Inductee (class of 1996)
Cleveland Association of Broadcasters Hall of Fame (class of 1999)

References

Further reading

External links 
Official Big Chuck and Lil' John Fan Web site
Sample chapter from Big Chuck!: My Favorite Stories from 47 Years on Cleveland TV
AmericanScary.com: Host Biographies
 E-gor's Chamber of TV Horror Hosts: Hoolihan and Big Chuck and Lil' John
Hoolihan, Big Chuck & Lil John Show Archives

American television personalities
American comedy duos
Television in Cleveland
Horror hosts
Local comedy television series in the United States
Local motion picture television series
1960s American satirical television series
1970s American satirical television series
1980s American satirical television series
1990s American satirical television series
2000s American satirical television series
1960s American sketch comedy television series
1970s American sketch comedy television series
1980s American sketch comedy television series
1990s American sketch comedy television series
2000s American sketch comedy television series
1966 American television series debuts
2007 American television series endings